Israfil Shahverdi oglu Shahverdiyev (11 June 1952, Unannovu, Lachin, Azerbaijan SSR -13 January 1994, Fuzuli, Azerbaijan) was the National Hero of Azerbaijan and warrior during the First Nagorno-Karabakh War.

Early life and education 
Shahverdiyev was born on 11 June 1952 in Unannovu village of Lachin Rayon of Azerbaijan SSR. He went to Secondary School in Unannovu between 1959 and 1969. From 1971 through 1974, Shahverdiyev served in the Soviet Armed Forces. In 1975, he started to work as a police officer in the Lachin District Department of Internal Affairs.

Personal life 
Shahverdiyev was married and had three children.

Nagorno-Karabakh war 
When Armenians attacked the territories of Azerbaijan, Shahverdiyev voluntarily went to the front-line. He captured two Armenian intelligence agents in the Qaladeresi village of the Shamakhi Rayon of Azerbaijan. Shahverdiyev played an important role in finding the murders of journalist Salatyn Asgerova who was killed during  the First Nagorno-Karabakh War.

In 1991, a plan was prepared for the release of the village of Qala deresi. In the battle that lasted until the morning, Armenian armed forces had to withdraw, leaving heavy losses. Shahverdiyev participated in several battles for the villages of Hoçaz qayası and Hoçaz.

On January 6, 1994, Shahverdiyev participated in the battle for the liberation of the villages of Fuzuli District with his soldiers. Seven days later on January 13, 1994, he was killed in a battle while he was trying to rescue his soldiers.

Honors 
Israfil Shahverdi oglu Shahverdiyev was posthumously awarded the title of the "National Hero of Azerbaijan" by Presidential Decree No. 262 dated 15 January 1995.
. 
 "Sultan bey" award - 1990.

Memorial 
Shahverdiyev was buried at a Martyrs' Lane cemetery in Baku. One of the secondary schools in Lachin District was named after him.

See also 
 First Nagorno-Karabakh War
 List of National Heroes of Azerbaijan

References

Sources 
 "İsrafilin gündəliyindən sətirlər", "Şərq" qəzeti. - 2011. - 29 iyul. - Səh.5.
 "Laçınlı Milli Qəhrəmanlar: İsrafil Şahverdiyev", "Laçın yurdu" jurnalı, No.1(1), 2011, Bakı, "Elm və təhsil", 2011.
 Vugar Asgarov. Azərbaycanın Milli Qəhrəmanları (Yenidən işlənmiş II nəşr). Bakı: "Dərələyəz-M", 2010, səh. 267.

External links 
 
 

1952 births
1994 deaths
Azerbaijani military personnel
Azerbaijani military personnel of the Nagorno-Karabakh War
Azerbaijani military personnel killed in action
National Heroes of Azerbaijan
People from Lachin District